The 1968 Denver Broncos season was the ninth season for the team in the American Football League (AFL). Led by second-year head coach and general manager Lou Saban, the Broncos improved their record from the previous season by posting a record of five wins and nine losses. They finished fourth in the AFL's Western division for the sixth straight season; the expansion Cincinnati Bengals finished fifth, allowing Denver to escape the cellar.

There were threats of the Broncos relocating to Atlanta, Chicago, and Birmingham, Alabama.

The 1968 season was the first in which Denver wore blue helmets with the trademark orange "D" logo. They wore this uniform through the 1973 season, altering the shade of orange in their jerseys in 1974; helmets remained the same until the 1997 season.

In 1968, Bears Stadium was sold to the city of Denver, which renamed it "Mile High Stadium" and built the upper deck along the west side, raising capacity to 50,657.

Offseason

NFL/AFL Draft

Personnel

Staff

Roster

Regular season

Schedule

Standings

References

External links
Denver Broncos – 1968 media guide
1968 Denver Broncos at Pro-Football-Reference.com

Denver Broncos seasons
Denver Broncos
1968 in sports in Colorado